Robert John Pethick (born 8 September 1970) is an English retired football defender.

Pethick was born in Tavistock, and played for Weymouth, Portsmouth and Bristol Rovers before his 2001 move to Brighton. Whilst at Brighton, Pethick scored once in the FA Cup against Norwich City. He returned to Weymouth to play under Steve Claridge, whilst the BBC show Football Diaries was shown. He subsequently played for Havant & Waterlooville before announcing his retirement in 2006.

Notes

External links

1970 births
Living people
Sportspeople from Tavistock
English footballers
Weymouth F.C. players
Portsmouth F.C. players
Bristol Rovers F.C. players
Brighton & Hove Albion F.C. players
Havant & Waterlooville F.C. players
Horndean F.C. players
Association football defenders